Bulgaria competed at the 2012 Winter Youth Olympics in Innsbruck, Austria. The Bulgarian team consisted of 11 athletes in 6 sports.

Alpine skiing

Bulgaria qualified one boy and girl in alpine skiing.

Boy

Girl

Biathlon

Bulgaria qualified a full team of two boys and girls.

Boys

Girls

Mixed

Cross country skiing

Bulgaria qualified one boy and girl.

Boy

Girl

Sprint

Mixed

Luge

Bulgaria qualified one boy.

Boy

Ski jumping

Bulgaria qualified one boy.

Boy

Snowboarding

Bulgaria qualified one boy.

Boy

See also
Bulgaria at the 2012 Summer Olympics

References

2012 in Bulgarian sport
Nations at the 2012 Winter Youth Olympics
Bulgaria at the Youth Olympics